Daniel Rantanen (born 11 May 1998) is a Finnish professional footballer who plays for TPS as a midfielder.

Career

Early years
Rantanen started playing football at the age of three at PK-35. He then moved to Puistolan Urheilijat, where he played for three years and then . However, 13-year old Rantanen then returned to PK-35.

Club career
Rantanen his senior career in 2015, when he was promoted to PK-35's first team and made his debut the day before his 17th birthday in the Ykkönen. In the 2015 season, Rantanen played a total of 18 Ykkönen matches and scored three goals, helping the team with promotion to the Veikkausliiga for the 2016 season.

He then moved to HIFK, which played in the Veikkausliiga for the 2016 season. Rantanen made his debut in Veikkausliiga on April 25, 2016 in against PS Kemi. In the summer 2016, he went on trials at Premier League clubs, Crystal Palace and later Stoke City. Rantanen scored two goals in a friendly game for Stoke and the club showed interest in him. However, he had recently signed with HIFK, which made such an operation difficult.

In the 2016 season, Rantanen only played four league matches in HIFK and then went on loan to IF Gnistan and later to his former club PK-35. In the 2017 season, Rantanen only played for HIFK's reserve team and U19s.

Rantanen joined Ekenäs IF, which played in Ykkönen for the 2019 season. He played a total of 23 Ykkönen matches in the 2019 season and scored six goals in them. On 10 December 2019 it was confirmed, that Rantanen had signed a one-year deal with AC Oulu.

On 9 December 2021, he agreed to join TPS for the 2022 season.

Private life
Daniel comes from a football family. His twin sister, Amanda Rantanen, is also a footballer. His mother, Anne Maria Weckström-Rantanen, has also played football and since worked as a football coach. His father, Rami Rantanen, as a former Finnish national player.

References

External links

1998 births
Living people
Finnish footballers
PK-35 Vantaa (men) players
HIFK Fotboll players
IF Gnistan players
Ekenäs IF players
AC Oulu players
Turun Palloseura footballers
Kakkonen players
Ykkönen players
Veikkausliiga players
Association football midfielders
Footballers from Helsinki
21st-century Finnish people